1:18 scale diecast replicas are 1/18th the size of the real vehicle. Most popular in this category are 1:18 scale automobile replicas – usually made out of Zamak zinc diecasting alloy with plastic parts. "1:18 scale" is the colloquial reference to this class of toy or replica.

Description
Virtually all 1:18 scale models produced in recent years have opening doors, hoods, and trunks along with functional steering wheels which turn the front wheels. Tires are often mounted on workable 'springy' suspension systems. Normally the hood / bonnet lifts to reveal a detailed and accurate engine bay (whether this is a separate cast piece or simply a portion of the cast and painted body located between the fenders). 

Higher end models are equipped with genuine leather interiors, accurate engine detail, operational sunroofs, movable windshield wipers, adjustable seats, operational gear levers and other realistic accessories. Such detail is common to 1:18 scales and larger. Typically, and according to local law, companies that produce model cars will have licensing arrangements with real car manufacturers to make replicas of their cars, both in current production or of discontinued models.

History
How 1:18 scale became a standard in diecast, especially during the 1990s, is somewhat of a question, but some of the first 1:18 scale cars appeared made in tin in the United States and Japan after World War II. These, however, were not precise in detail or proportion, but became popular in the late 1950s and early 1960s. Before World War II, some vehicle appeared in this size. Also rather by chance, other manufacturers, like Marx in the 1960s and 1970s simply made 1:18 scale large plastic toys. Plastic models in the United States, though, normally were produced in 1:25 scale.

The first zinc alloy metal cars in this scale (and also 1:24 scale) from European Manufacturers appeared around 1970, made by the likes of German Schuco Modell, Polistil, and Gama Toys. Pocher, the Italian kit maker, even manufactured kits in a large 1:8 scale. A review of models by Consumer Reports in 1979 discussed American plastic and European diecast metal models in 1:25 and 1:24 scales, but did not once mention 1:18 scale, showing that it had not yet come into marketing popularity (Consumer Reports 1979). European model makers like Schuco (which was later revived), Gama and Marklin went defunct and the market for 1:18 scale grew steadily during the mid-1980s, mainly with the likes of Bburago, Polistil (both Italian companies mass-manufacturing models in Italy) and then, later, the Asian Maisto which, arguably became the principle manufacturer of this scale worldwide. Around this time, 1:18 scale cars based around a single model that was variously repurposed were famously used for the climactic Stay Puft Marshmallow Man sequence in Ghostbusters.

Throughout the 1990s, the number of different models in this scale increased exponentially as Chinese production cut manufacturing costs. Models could be sold for anywhere from $10.00 to $25.00 in the United States. By about 2000, it appeared that 1:18 scale had dominated other scales in marketing (except the diminutive and ever popular Hot Wheels) – as nearly whole rows in Toys-R-Us could be seen packed with this scale of model. At this time, many new companies flooded the 1:18 scale market. Ertl and Revell sold a limited number of diecast cars – mostly older American models (although Revell Germany made a number of diecast German and American models). Ertl's main 1:18 scale line was called "American Muscle".  Other manufacturers included Anson, Yat Ming, Sun Star, MIRA, and UT Models.  Often, cars featured in collectible car magazines (such as Collectible Automobile) were soon the subjects of 1:18 diecast articles.  

During the early 2000s, the quality and accuracy of models improved dramatically, but price went up and they were sold in more upscale stores, dealerships, and through on-line mail order. Around 2005, "premium" manufacturers including Automodelli, Highway 61, GMP, AUTOart, and Lane Exact Detail began to offer very high-quality, highly detailed models at higher prices. Today (2017), a trickle-down effect can be seen where many features now found in mainstream, low-priced diecasts were only found before in models costing upwards of $100.00. Engine wiring and plumbing, carpeting in the interior or trunk, detailed instrument panels, seatbelts, and photo-etched details are now common even in models costing under $50.00.   

Models are found from a number of retail merchants, such as Wal-Mart and KB Toys (in the United States), and a number of Antique Malls and Centers offer models ranging from $20.00. Many, of course, are available through eBay, etsy or other bidding and diecast sales websites. This size remains popular with collectors. With the popularity of eBay and other hobby Web sites, fewer models of this size seem to be found in physical stores.
1970 Chevy Chevelle SS 454

Significant Categories of Replicas

Antique/Classics (pre-World War II)
Construction vehicles
Fifties Cars
Formula 1 Cars
Modern Cars (1990s and newer)
Muscle Cars (1960s–1970s)
Police Cars
Sports Cars
Touring Cars

Manufacturers of 1:18 replica automobiles

ACME Manufacturing
Action Performance
Anson (now discontinued)
Auto World
AUTOart
Bad
Bauer
BBR / Top Marques
Bburago
Biante
Carmania
Carousel 1
Classic Carlectables
CMC
Chrono (Classic British marques)
Ertl
Exoto
Fairfield Collectables
Fast Women
Gate (a division of Gateway which also owns AUTOArt)
Giodi (now discontinued)
GMP
Greenlight Collectibles
GT Spirit
Guiloy
Highway 61 Diecast Promotions by FF Ertl
Hot Works
Hot Wheels / Hot Wheels Elite / Mattel
Ignition
Jada
Jadi
Jouef Evolution (by Jouef, now discontinued,
Kyosho
Lane / Exact Detail
Maisto
Minichamps / Paul's Model Art
Mira
Milestone Development Group 
Mondo Motors
Motor City Classics
Motorhead Miniatures
Motorart
Motormax / RBI
Muscle Machines
MR Collection
Neo (in mold-cast resin, not metal)
NEX
Norev
Onyx / Quartzo
OttOmobile (in mold-cast resin, not metal)
Paudi Model 
Playjocs Spain
Polistil (discontinued in 1993)
Precision Miniatures (now discontinued)
Racing Champions (now discontinued)
Revell
Ricko
R & R
Schuco
Shelby Collectibles
Signature Models
Solido / Majorette
Spark / Minimax
Sun Star
Technomodel
Toystate
True Scale
Universal Hobbies / Eagle Collectibles / Jouef
UT Models (now discontinued)
Welly
Winners Circle
Yat-Ming

See also
Die-cast toy

References

Further reading
 Consumer Guide.  1979.  Model Cars.  New York: Beekman House.  .

Scale model scales
Toy cars and trucks
Die-cast toys
pt:1/18